Edward Nally is a solicitor.  He is a Partner of Fieldings Porter, a firm of solicitors in Bolton, and was President of the Law Society in 2004–2005.  He is Governor of the College of Law and Chair of Governors at Pendleton Sixth Form College, Salford.  He was appointed as a member of the Judicial Appointments Commission in January 2006, as a representative of the legal profession.

External links
Partner profiles from Fieldings Porter
Chair and Commissioners from the Judicial Appointments Commission

Year of birth missing (living people)
Living people
English solicitors
Presidents of the Law Society of England and Wales